Mimika Regency is one of the regencies (kabupaten) in the Indonesian province of Central Papua. It covers an area of 21,693.51 km2, and had a population of 182,001 at the 2010 Census, but grew to 311,969 at the 2020 Census. The official estimate as at mid 2021 was 316,295. The administrative centre is the town of Timika, which lies within Mimika Baru District, which had 144,893 inhabitants in mid 2021.

History
On 8 October 1996, the Minister of Home Affairs in Jayapura designated Mimika as an Administrative District. After being formed into an Administrative Regency, the District area was determined to consist of: Mimika Timur (East Mimika) District, Mimika Barat (West Mimika) District, Agimuga District and the expansion area of Mimika Baru District which is domiciled in Timika. After approximately 4 (four) years of the implementation of the Administrative Regency administration, on 18 March 2000, the change of status from Administrative District to Definitive Regency was inaugurated by the Governor of Papua Province, Drs. JP Salossa, M.Si based on Law No.45 of 1999.

Administrative Districts
Mimika Regency in 2010 comprised twelve districts (kecamatan); by 2018 the number of districts had risen to eighteen, all of which are tabulated below with their populations at the 2010 Census and the 2020 Census, as well as the official estimates as at mid 2021. The table also includes the location of the district administrative centres, the number of administrative villages (133 rural desa and 19 urban kelurahan) within each district, and its post code.

Note: (a) the 2010 population is included in the figure for the district from which it was split off.

References

External links
Statistics publications from Statistics Indonesia (BPS)

 
Regencies of Central Papua
Timika